The 1990 Cal Poly Mustangs football team represented California Polytechnic State University during the 1990 NCAA Division II football season.

Cal Poly competed in the Western Football Conference (WFC). The Mustangs were led by fourth-year head coach Lyle Setencich and played home games at Mustang Stadium in San Luis Obispo, California. They finished the regular season as co-champion of the WFC, with a record of nine wins and one loss.

At the end of the season, the Mustangs qualified for the Division II playoffs. In the first game, they defeated the other WFC co-champion, Cal State Northridge. In the quarterfinal game the Mustangs were defeated by North Dakota State. That brought their final record to ten wins and two losses (10–2, 4–1 WFC). Overall, the team outscored its opponents 304–167 for the season.

Schedule

Notes

References

Cal Poly Mustgs
Cal Poly Mustangs football seasons
Western Football Conference champion seasons
Cal Poly Mustangs football